Nasif Rashad Majeed is a Democratic member of the North Carolina House of Representatives. He has represented the 99th district since 2019.

Career
Majeed flew combat missions as a B-52 pilot over North Vietnam.
In 2018 Majeed won the general election for a seat in the North Carolina House of Representatives. He secured eighty-two percent of the vote while his closest rival, Republican Joshua Niday, secured eighteen percent. Majeed served on the Charlotte City Council for eight years, Housing Authority, Planning Commission and the Governor’s Commission on Education for Economic Growth.  He is a graduate of North Carolina A&T State University, earning a BS in Business Administration and a Masters in Agricultural Education.  Majeed is a decorated Air Force combat pilot.  He is the recipient of the North Carolina Department of Military & Veterans Affairs, African American Veterans Lineage Medal of Distinction. He was a Captain and Aircraft Commander of a B-52 Strategic Bomber, flying over 120 combat missions over North Vietnam.  He later was a pilot with Piedmont Airlines, now American Airlines.  In 1975, Majeed served as the Director of Aviation for the World Community of Islam in the West under the Leadership of Imam W. Deen Mohammed in Chicago, Illinois. As President of the West Charlotte Merchants Association and the Plaza Eastway Partners Coalition of Neighborhoods, he spearheaded the creation of two major community based building projects in Charlotte.  The West Charlotfe Business Incubator and the $40 million dollar Eastway Regional Recreation Center.

Majeed owned and operated a Burger King franchise in Charlotte.  He is the former Chairman of the American Coalition for Good Government, a national political education organization.  Majeed served fourteen years as a Clinical Chaplain for the North Carolina Department of Corrections.  He is an Associate Imam at Masjid Ash-Shaheed in Charlotte.

Electoral history

2020

2018

References

Living people
1945 births
People from Charlotte, North Carolina
North Carolina A&T State University alumni
21st-century American politicians
Democratic Party members of the North Carolina House of Representatives